Nicanor Villareal (born 1 April 1919) was a Mexican gymnast. He competed in three events at the 1948 Summer Olympics.

References

1919 births
Possibly living people
Mexican male artistic gymnasts
Olympic gymnasts of Mexico
Gymnasts at the 1948 Summer Olympics
Place of birth missing
20th-century Mexican people